Verkhny Ikorets is a rural locality (a selo) and the administrative center of Verkhneikoretskoye Rural Settlement, Bobrovsky District, Voronezh Oblast, Russia. The population was 1,155 as of 2010. There are 16 streets.

Geography 
Verkhny Ikorets is located 21 km northwest of Bobrov (the district's administrative centre) by road. Neskuchny is the nearest rural locality.

References 

Rural localities in Bobrovsky District